Tall ad Dirrah (also spelled Tell Dirrah, Tall Derah, Talldarra or Tell ad-Dura) is a Syrian village in the Salamiyah Subdistrict in Salamiyah District, located southeast of Hama. According to the Syria Central Bureau of Statistics (CBS), Taldara had a population of 5,986 in the 2004 census. Its inhabitants are predominantly Ismailis.

History
Tall ad Dirrah was initially founded in 1836 when it was acquired by Muhammad Khurfan Bey, a chief of the Mawali tribe in the Hama region. Prior to that, the village had been vacated. Like other places in the Salamiyah area that the Ottoman authorities encouraged to be repopulated, the settlers of Taldara came from the Mawali, Nu'aym and Uqaydat tribes. However, just two years later, Taldara and all of the other villages of Salamiyah were reported to have been deserted.

Tall ad Dirrah was re-established in the late 19th century by Ismaili migrants from other parts of northern Syria who chose to settle the place because of worsening economic conditions in the interior parts of Syria, the low taxes that living in the Syrian Desert fringes offered, and the place's proximity to Salamiyah, the center of Ismaili life in Syria.

References 

1836 establishments in the Ottoman Empire
Populated places established in 1836
Populated places in Salamiyah District
Ismaili communities in Syria